Luis Muciño (born 24 April 1936) is a former Mexican cyclist. He competed in the sprint and tandem events at the 1960 Summer Olympics.

References

External links
 

1936 births
Living people
Mexican male cyclists
Olympic cyclists of Mexico
Cyclists at the 1960 Summer Olympics
Sportspeople from Mexico City